In chess, there is a general consensus among players and theorists that the player who makes the first move (White) has an inherent advantage. Since 1851, compiled statistics support this view; White consistently  slightly more often than Black, usually scoring between 52 and 56 percent. White's  is about the same for tournament games between humans and games between computers; however, White's advantage is less significant in blitz games and games between lower-level players.

Chess players and theoreticians have long debated whether, given perfect play by both sides, the game should end in a win for White or a draw. Since approximately 1889, when World Champion Wilhelm Steinitz addressed this issue, the consensus has been that a perfectly played game would end in a draw (futile game). A few notable players have argued, however, that White's advantage may be sufficient to  a win: Weaver Adams and Vsevolod Rauzer claimed that White is winning after the first move 1.e4, while Hans Berliner argued that 1.d4 may win for White. Chess is not a solved game, however, and it is considered unlikely that the game will be solved in the foreseeable future.

Some players, including world champions such as José Raúl Capablanca, Emanuel Lasker, and Bobby Fischer, have expressed fears of a "draw death" as chess becomes more deeply analyzed. To alleviate this danger, Capablanca and Fischer both proposed chess variants to revitalize the game, while Lasker suggested changing how draws and stalemates are scored.

Some writers have challenged the view that White has an inherent advantage. Grandmaster (GM) András Adorján wrote a series of books on the theme that "Black is OK!", arguing that the general perception that White has an advantage is founded more in psychology than reality. GM Mihai Suba and others contend that sometimes White's initiative disappears for no apparent reason as a game progresses. Modern writers also argue that Black has certain countervailing advantages. The consensus that White should try to win can be a psychological burden for the White player, who sometimes loses by trying too hard to win. Some  openings (i.e. those where Black's moves mirror White's) can lead to situations where moving first is a detriment, for either psychological or objective reasons.

Winning percentages

In 1946, W.F. Streeter examined the results of 5,598 games played in 45 international chess tournaments between 1851 and 1932. Streeter found that overall White scored 53.4% (W: 38.12; D: 30.56; L: 31.31). White scored 52.55% in 1851–1878 (W:45.52; D: 14.07; L: 40.41), 52.77% in 1881–1914 (W: 36.89; D: 31.76; L: 31.35), and 55.47% in 1919–1932 (W: 36.98; D: 36.98; L: 26.04). Streeter concluded, "It thus appears that it is becoming increasingly difficult to win with Black, but somewhat easier to draw."

Two decades later, statistician Arthur M. Stevens concluded in The Blue Book of Charts to Winning Chess, based on a survey of 56,972 master games that he completed in 1967, that White scores 59.1%. However, Stevens assembled his games from those that had been published in chess magazines, rather than complete collections of all the games played in particular events.

More recent sources indicate that White scores approximately 54 to 56 percent. In 2005, GM Jonathan Rowson wrote that "the conventional wisdom is that White begins the game with a small advantage and, holding all other factors constant, scores approximately 56% to Black's 44%". International Master (IM) John Watson wrote in 1998 that White had scored 56% for most of the 20th century, but that this figure had recently slipped to 55%. The website Chessgames.com holds regularly updated statistics on its games database. As of January 12, 2015, White had won 37.50%, 34.90% were drawn, and Black had won 27.60% out of 739,769 games, resulting in a total White winning percentage of 54.95%.

New In Chess observed in its 2000 Yearbook that of the 731,740 games in its database, White scored 54.8% overall; with the two most popular opening moves, White scored 54.1% in 349,855 games beginning 1.e4 (moving the king's pawn two spaces forward), and 56.1% in 296,200 games beginning 1.d4 (moving the queen's pawn two spaces forward). The main reason that 1.e4 was less effective than 1.d4 was the Sicilian Defence (1.e4 c5), which gave White only a 52.3% score in 145,996 games.

Statistician Jeff Sonas, in examining data from 266,000 games played between 1994 and 2001, concluded that White scored 54.1767% plus 0.001164 times White's Elo rating advantage, treating White's rating advantage as +390 if it is better than +390, or −460 if it is worse than −460. He found that White's advantage is equivalent to 35 rating points, i.e. if White has a rating 35 points below Black's, each player will have an expected score of 50%. Sonas also found that White's advantage is smaller (53%) in rapid games than in games at a slower ("classical") time control. In the 462 games played at the 2009 World Blitz Chess Championship, White scored only 52.16% (W38.96 D26.41 L34.63).

Other writers conclude that there is a positive correlation between the players' ratings and White's score. According to GM Evgeny Sveshnikov, statistics show that White has no advantage over Black in games between beginners, but "if the players are stronger, White has the lead". An analysis of the results of games in ChessBase's Mega 2003 database between players with similar Elo ratings, commissioned by GM András Adorján, showed that as the players' ratings went up, the percentage of draws increased, the proportion of decisive games that White won increased, and White's overall winning percentage increased. For example, taking the highest and lowest of Adorján's rating categories of 1669 games played by the highest-rated players (Elo ratings 2700 and above), White scored 55.7% overall (W26.5 D58.4 L15.2), whereas of 34,924 games played by the lowest-rated players (Elo ratings below 2100), White scored 53.1% overall (W37.0 D32.1 L30.8). Adorján also analyzed the results of games played at the very highest level: World Championship matches. Of 755 games played in 34 matches between 1886 and 1990, White won 234 (31.0%), drew 397 (52.6%), and lost 124 (16.4%), for a total white winning percentage of 57.3%. In the last five matches in Adorjan's survey, all between Anatoly Karpov and Garry Kasparov, White won 31 (25.8%), drew 80 (66.7%), and lost 9 (7.5%), for a total white winning percentage of 59.2%.

Chess Engines Grand Tournament (CEGT) tests computer chess engines by playing them against each other, with time controls of 40 moves in 120 minutes per player (40/120), and also 40/20 and 40/4, and uses the results of those games to compile a rating list for each time control. At the slowest time control (40/120), White has scored 55.4% (W34.7 D41.3 L24.0) in games played among 38 of the strongest chess engines (as of May 27, 2009). At 40/20, White has scored 55.1% (W35.6 D39.1 L25.3) in games played among 1568 engines (as of April 22, 2018). At the fastest time control (40/4), White has scored 54.8% (W39.6 D30.5 L30.0), in games played among 128 programs (as of May 28, 2009).

In 2017 AlphaZero, playing 100 games against Stockfish, won 25 and drew 25 as White, but won 3 and drew 47 as Black.

Drawn with best play

Joseph Bertin wrote in his 1735 textbook The Noble Game of Chess, "He that plays first, is understood to have the attack." Because White begins with the initiative, a minor mistake by White generally leads only to loss of the initiative, while a similar mistake by Black may have more serious consequences. Thus, Sveshnikov wrote in 1994, "Black players cannot afford to make even the slightest mistake ... from a theoretical point of view, the tasks of White and Black in chess are different: White has to strive for a win, Black—for a draw!"

Chess theorists have long debated how enduring White's initiative is and whether, if both sides play perfectly, the game should end in a win for White or a draw. George Walker wrote in 1846 that, "The first move is an advantage, ... but if properly answered, the first move is of little worth". Steinitz, the first World Champion, who is widely considered the father of modern chess, wrote in 1889, "It is now conceded by all experts that by proper play on both sides the legitimate issue of a game ought to be a draw." Lasker and Capablanca, the second and third World Champions, agreed. Reuben Fine, one of the world's leading players from 1936 to 1951, wrote that White's opening advantage is too intangible to be sufficient for a win without an error by Black.

The view that a game of chess should end in a draw given best play prevails. Even if it cannot be proved, this assumption is considered "safe" by Rowson and "logical" by Adorján. Watson agrees that "the proper result of a perfectly played chess game ... is a draw. ... Of course, I can't prove this, but I doubt that you can find a single strong player who would disagree. ... I remember Kasparov, after a last-round draw, explaining to the waiting reporters: 'Well, chess is a draw. World Champion Bobby Fischer thought that "it's almost definite that the game is a draw theoretically". Similarly, British grandmaster Nigel Short wrote that "... with perfect play, God versus God ... chess is a draw".

Lasker and Capablanca both worried that chess would suffer a "draw death" as top-level players drew more and more of their games. More recently, Fischer agreed, saying that the game has become played out. All three advocated changing the rules of chess to minimize the number of drawn games. Lasker suggested scoring less than half a point for a draw, and more than half a point for stalemating the opponent's king. Capablanca in the 1920s proposed Capablanca Chess, a chess variant played on a larger 8×10 board and with additional pieces (the chancellor and archbishop, moving as rook–knight and bishop–knight combinations respectively in the same way the queen could be said to be a rook–bishop combination). Fischer advocated Fischerandom Chess, another chess variant, in which the initial position of the pieces is determined at random and identical for both players, subject to the constraints that the bishops be on opposite colours and that the king stand between the rooks.

For example, at the highest levels, Black often uses the Marshall Attack in the Ruy Lopez. In this line Black sacrifices a pawn for strong attacking chances, to obtain an endgame where Black is still a pawn down but is able to draw with correct play.

In 2007, GMs Kiril Georgiev and Atanas Kolev asserted that much the same was true of the so-called Poisoned Pawn Variation of the Najdorf Sicilian, which arises after 1.e4 c5 2.Nf3 d6 3.d4 cxd4 4.Nxd4 Nf6 5.Nc3 a6 6.Bg5 e6 7.f4 Qb6 This has long been considered one of the sharpest and most problematic, or even foolhardy, opening lines. The game usually continues 8.Qd2 Qxb2 9.Rb1 Qa3. They wrote that the following game "will probably remain the last word of theory":

Francisco Vallejo Pons–Garry Kasparov, Moscow 2004; Poisoned Pawn Variation 1. e4 c5 2. Nf3 d6 3. d4 cxd4 4. Nxd4 Nf6 5. Nc3 a6 6. Bg5 e6 7. f4 Qb6 8. Qd2 Qxb2 9. Rb1 Qa3 10. f5 Nc6 11. fxe6 fxe6 12. Nxc6 bxc6 13. e5 dxe5 14. Bxf6 gxf6 15. Ne4 Qxa2 16. Rd1 Be7 17. Be2 0-0 18. 0-0 Ra7 19. Rf3 Kh8 20. Rg3 Rd7 21. Qh6 Rf7 22. Qh5 Rxd1+ 23. Bxd1 Qa5 24. Kf1 Qd8 25. Qxf7 Qxd1+ 26. Kf2 Qxc2+ 27. Kf3 Qd1+ 28. Kf2 Qc2+ 29. Ke3 Bc5+ 30. Nxc5 Qxc5+ 31. Kd2 Qf2+ 32. Kc3 Qd4+ 33. Kc2 Qf2+ 34. Kc3 ½–½ (After 34...Qd4+, White cannot escape the checks.)

Georgiev and Kolev's pessimistic assessment of 6.Bg5 has since been called into question, however, as White succeeded with 10.e5 (another critical line) in several later high-level games. GM Zaven Andriasyan wrote in 2013 that after 10.f5, "a forced draw results", but that after 10.e5, "we reach a very sharp position, with mutual chances."

White wins
Although it is very much a minority view, three prominent twentieth-century masters claimed that White's advantage should or may be decisive with best play.

White wins with 1.e4

Weaver Adams, then one of the leading American masters, was the best-known proponent of this view, which he introduced in his 1939 book White to Play and Win, and continued to expound in later books and articles until shortly before his death in 1963. Adams opined that 1.e4 was White's strongest move, and that if both sides played the best moves thereafter, "White ought to win." Adams' claim was widely ridiculed, and he did not succeed in demonstrating the validity of his theory in tournament and match practice. The year after his book was published, at the finals of the 1940 U.S. Open tournament, he scored only one draw in his four games as White, but won all four of his games as Black. Adams also lost a match to IM I.A. Horowitz, who took the black pieces in every game.

According to Sveshnikov, Vsevolod Rauzer, a leading Soviet player and theoretician during the 1930s, likewise "claimed in the [1930s]: '1.e4—and White wins!' and he managed to prove it quite often".

White wins with 1.d4

More recently, IM Hans Berliner, a former World Champion of Correspondence Chess, claimed in his 1999 book The System that 1.d4 gives White a large, and possibly decisive, advantage. Berliner asserted that with best play White wins against the Grünfeld Defense, the Modern Benoni, the Benko Gambit and other (unnamed) "major defences", and achieves at least a large advantage in many lines of the Queen's Gambit Declined. He allowed, however, that "It is possible that the rules of chess are such that only some number of plausible-appearing defences to 1.d4 can be refuted." Berliner wrote that Adams' "theories, though looked upon with scorn by most top chess players, made an immediate and lasting impression on me. Weaver W. Adams was the first person I met who actually had theories about how chess should be played."

Berliner's thesis, like Adams', has been sharply criticized.

Modern perspectives
As explained below, chess theorists in recent decades have continued to debate the size and nature of White's advantage, if any. Apart from Berliner, they have rejected the idea that White has a forced win from the opening position. Many also reject the traditional paradigm that Black's objective should be to neutralize White's initiative and obtain equality.

White has an enduring advantage
Starting from 2004, GM Larry Kaufman has expressed a more nuanced view than Adams and Berliner, arguing that the initiative stemming from the first move can always be transformed into some sort of enduring advantage, albeit not necessarily a decisive one. He wrote in 2020, "I don't believe that White has a forced win in chess, but I do believe that if he starts with 1.e4 and makes no mistakes, he can retain at least the preferable position without allowing an obvious draw for 30 to 40 moves or so, beyond the point to which openings can generally be analyzed. He  should normally get positions where it is fairly easy to explain why White is better, even if in many cases a grandmaster can expect to hold the draw  against a similar opponent. Black should at least be the one who has to be careful to get the draw." Nonetheless, Kaufman considers it necessary for White to make no mistakes to achieve this evaluation. Kaufman writes that "once White makes one or two second-rate moves I start to look for a black advantage."

Black is OK!
Starting in 1988, Adorján has argued in a series of books and magazine articles that "Black is OK!" Alone amongst modern writers, Adorján claims that White starts the game with essentially no advantage. He writes, "In my opinion, the only obvious advantage for White is that if he or she plays for a draw, and does so well, then Black can hardly avoid this without taking obvious risks." Adorján goes so far as to claim that, "The tale of White's advantage is a delusion; belief in it is based on mass psychosis." Rowson writes that Adorján's "contention is one of the most important chess ideas of the last two decades ... because it has shaken our assumption that White begins the game with some advantage, and revealed its ideological nature". Rowson rejects Adorján's claim, however, that White has essentially no advantage, reasoning that White is better' and 'Black is OK' need not be mutually exclusive claims".

In one of Adorján's books, GM Lajos Portisch opined that "at least two-thirds of all 'tested' openings give White an apparent advantage." According to Portisch, for Black, "The root of the problem is that very few people know which are the openings where Black is really OK. Those who find these lines have nothing to fear, as Black is indeed OK, but only in those variations!" Rowson considers this an important point, noting that "1.d4 players struggle to get anywhere against main-line Slavs and 1.e4 players find the Najdorf and Sveshnikov Sicilians particularly tough."

Dynamism
Modern writers often think of Black's role in more  terms than merely trying to equalize. Rowson writes that "the idea of Black trying to 'equalize' is questionable. I think it has limited application to a few openings, rather than being an opening prescription for Black in general." Evans wrote that after one of his games against Fischer, "Fischer confided his 'secret' to me: unlike other masters, he sought to win with the Black pieces from the start. The revelation that Black has dynamic chances and need not be satisfied with mere equality was the turning point in his career, he said." Likewise, Watson surmised that Kasparov, when playing Black, bypasses the question of whether White has an opening advantage "by thinking in terms of the concrete nature of the dynamic imbalance on the board, and seeking to seize the initiative whenever possible". Watson observes that "energetic opening play by Black may ... lead to a position so complex and unclear that to speak of equality is meaningless. Sometimes we say 'dynamically balanced' instead of 'equal' to express the view that either player is as likely as the other to emerge from complications with an advantage. This style of opening play has become prevalent in modern chess, with World Champions Fischer and Kasparov as its most visible practitioners."

Modern writers also question the idea that White has an enduring advantage. Suba, in his influential 1991 book Dynamic Chess Strategy, rejects the notion that the initiative can always be transformed into an enduring advantage. He contends that sometimes the player with the initiative loses it with no logical explanation, and that, "Sometimes you must lose it, just like that. If you try to cling to it, by forcing the issue, your dynamic potential will become exhausted and you won't be able to face a vigorous counter-attack." Rowson and Watson concur. Watson also observes, "Because of the presumption of White being better, the juncture of the game at which Black frees his game or neutralizes White's plans has often been automatically assumed to give him equality, even though in dynamic openings, the exhaustion of White's initiative very often means that Black has seized it with advantage."

Countervailing advantages
Rowson argues that both White and Black have certain advantages:

White's advantages

According to Rowson, White's first advantage is that, "The advantage of the first move has some similarities with the serve in tennis in that White can score an 'ace' (for instance with a powerful ), he has more control over the pace and direction of the game, and he has a 'second serve' in that when things go wrong his position is not usually losing." Second, White begins the game with some initiative, although Rowson regards this as a psychological rather than a positional advantage, "and whether it leads to a positional advantage depends on the relative skill of the players." Third, some players are able to use the initiative to "play a kind of powerful 'serve and volley' chess in which Black is flattened with a mixture of deep  and  prowess." Fourth, "If White wants to draw, it is often not so easy for Black to prevent this. This advantage is particularly acute in cases where there is a possible threefold repetition, because White can begin the repetition without committing to a draw and Black has to decide whether to deviate before he knows whether White is bluffing."

Rowson cites as an example of the last phenomenon the well-regarded Zaitsev Variation of the Ruy Lopez. After 1.e4 e5 2.Nf3 Nc6 3.Bb5 a6 4.Ba4 Nf6 5.0-0 Be7 6.Re1 b5 7.Bb3 0-0 8.c3 d6 9.h3 Bb7 10.d4 Re8 (initiating the Zaitsev Variation), White can repeat moves once with 11.Ng5 Rf8 12.Nf3. This puts Black in an awkward situation, since he must either (a) insist on the Zaitsev with 12...Re8, which allows White to choose whether to draw by threefold repetition with 13.Ng5 Rf8 14.Nf3, or play on with a different move, or (b) play a different (and possibly inferior) variation by playing something other than 12...Re8.

Black's advantages
Rowson argues that Black also has several advantages. First, "White's alleged advantage is also a kind of obligation to play for a win, and Black can often use this to his advantage." Second, "White's 'extra move' can be a burden, and sometimes White finds himself in a mild form of zugzwang ('Zugzwang Lite')." Third, although White begins the game with the initiative, if "Black retains a flexible position with good reactive possibilities, this initiative can be absorbed and often passes over to Black." Fourth, "The fact that White moves before Black often gives Black useful information". Suba likewise argues that White's advantage is actually less than a move, since White must tip his hand first, allowing Black to react to White's plans. Suba writes, "In terms of the mathematical games theory, chess is a game of complete information, and Black's information is always greater—by one move!"

Rowson also notes that Black's chances increase markedly by playing good openings, which tend to be those with flexibility and latent potential, "rather than those that give White fixed targets or that try to take the initiative prematurely." He also emphasizes that "White has 'the initiative', not 'the advantage'. Success with Black depends on seeing beyond the initiative and thinking of positions in terms of 'potential'." These ideas are exemplified by the Hedgehog, a dynamic modern system against the English Opening that can arise from various . A typical position arises after 1.c4 c5 2.Nf3 Nf6 3.g3 b6 4.Bg2 Bb7 5.0-0 e6 6.Nc3 Be7 7.d4 cxd4 8.Qxd4 d6 9.e4 a6. Watson remarks, "Black's goal is to remain elastic and flexible, with many options for his pieces, whereas White can become paralyzed at some point by the need to protect against various dynamic ." He also observes that, "White tends to be as much tied up by Black's latent activity as Black himself is tied up by White's space advantage." Moreover, attempts by White to overrun Black's position often rebound disastrously. An example of this is the following grandmaster game:

Lev Polugaevsky–Ľubomír Ftáčnik, Lucerne Olympiad 1982: 1. Nf3 Nf6 2. c4 c5 3. Nc3 e6 4. g3 b6 5. Bg2 Bb7 6. 0-0 Be7 7. d4 cxd4 8. Qxd4 d6 9. Rd1 a6 10. b3 Nbd7 11. e4 Qb8 12. Bb2 0-0 Suba wrote of a similar Hedgehog position, "White's position looks ideal. That's the naked truth about it, but the 'ideal' has by definition one drawback—it cannot be improved." 13. Nd2 Rd8 14. a4 Qc7 15. Qe3 Rac8 16. Qe2 Ne5 17. h3 According to Ftáčnik, 17.f4 Neg4 18.Rf1 is better. h5 18. f4 Ng6 19. Nf3 Now Black breaks open the position in typical Hedgehog fashion. d5! 20. cxd5 Ftáčnik considers 20.e5 or 20.exd5 preferable. h4! 21. Nxh4 Nxh4 22. gxh4 Qxf4 23. dxe6 fxe6 24. e5? Ftáčnik recommends instead 24.Rxd8 Rxd8 25.Rd1. Bc5+ 25. Kh1 Nh5! 26. Qxh5 Qg3 27. Nd5 Other moves get mated immediately: 27.Bxb7 Qh3#; 27.Qe2 Qxh3#; 27.Qg4 Bxg2#. Rxd5 28. Rf1 Qxg2+! 29. Kxg2 Rd2+  White resigned. If 30.Kg3 (the only legal response to the double check), 30...Rg2+ 31.Kf4 Rf8+ forces mate.

An examination of reversed and symmetrical openings illustrates White's and Black's respective advantages:

Reversed openings
In a "reversed opening", White plays an opening typically played by Black, but with colors reversed and thus an extra tempo. Evans writes of such openings, "If a defense is considered good for Black, it must be even better for White with a move in hand." Former World Champion Mikhail Botvinnik reportedly expressed the same view. Watson questions this idea, citing Suba's thesis that Black, by moving second, has more complete information than White. He writes, "everyone has such difficulties playing as White against a Sicilian Defence (1.e4 c5), but ... leading masters have no qualms about answering 1.c4 with 1...e5." To explain this paradox, Watson discusses several different reversed Sicilian lines, showing how Black can exploit the disadvantages of various "extra" moves for White. He concludes, The point is, Black's set-up in the Sicilian is fine as a reactive system, but not worth much when trying to claim the initiative as White. This is true because Black is able to react to the specific plan White chooses; in Suba's terms, his information is indeed a move greater! Furthermore, he is able to take advantage of dead equal positions which White (hoping to retain the advantage of the first move) would normally avoid.

Watson also observes, "Similarly, the Dutch Defence looks particularly sterile when White achieves the reversed positions a tempo up (it turns out that he has nothing useful to do!); and indeed, many standard Black openings are not very inspiring when one gets them as White, tempo in hand." GM Alex Yermolinsky likewise notes that GM Vladimir Malaniuk, a successful exponent of the Leningrad Dutch (1.d4 f5 2.g3 g6) at the highest levels, "once made a deep impression on me by casually dismissing someone's suggestion that he should try 1.f4 as White. He smiled and said, 'That extra move's gonna hurt me.

Yermolinsky also agrees with Alekhine's criticism of 1.g3 e5 2.Nf3, a reversed Alekhine's Defense, in Réti–Alekhine, Baden-Baden 1925, writing that Alekhine "understood the difference in opening philosophies for White and Black, and realized they just can't be the same! White is supposed to try for more than just obtaining a comfortable game in reversed colour opening set-ups, and, as the statistics show—surprisingly for a lot of people, but not for me—White doesn't even score as well as Black does in the same positions with his extra tempo and all." Howard Staunton, generally considered to have been the strongest player in the world from 1843 to 1851, made a similar point over 160 years ago, writing that Owen's Defense (1.e4 b6) is playable for Black, but that 1.b3 is inferior to "the more customary [first] moves, from its being essentially defensive". The current view is that Owen's Defense is slightly better for White, while 1.b3 is playable but less likely to yield an opening advantage than 1.e4 or 1.d4.

Watson concludes that 
 "most moves have disadvantages as well as advantages, so an extra move is not always an unqualified blessing"; 
 "with his extra information about what White is doing, Black can better react to the new situation"; and 
 because a draw is likely to be more acceptable to Black than to White, White is apt to avoid lines that allow drawish simplifications, while Black may not object to such lines.

Symmetrical openings
Rowson writes that "in general one would assume that whatever advantage White has would be revealed most clearly in symmetrical positions." Accordingly, Watson, Suba, Evans, and the eminent player and theorist Aron Nimzowitsch (1886–1935) have all argued that it is in Black's interest to avoid symmetry. Nonetheless, even symmetrical opening lines sometimes illustrate the tenuous nature of White's advantage, in several respects.

It is often difficult for White to prove an advantage in symmetrical opening lines. As GM Bent Larsen wrote, annotating a game that began 1.c4 c5 2.b3 b6, "In symmetrical openings, White has a theoretical advantage, but in many of them it is only theoretical." GM Andrew Soltis wrote in 2008 that he hates playing against the symmetrical Petroff's Defense (1.e4 e5 2.Nf3 Nf6), and accordingly varies with 2.Nc3, the Vienna Game. However, there too he has been unable to find a way to an advantage after the symmetrical 2...Nc6 3.g3 g6 4.Bg2 Bg7, or after 3.Nf3 Nf6 ( to the Four Knights Game) 4.Bb5 Bb4 5.0-0 0-0 6.d3 d6 7.Bg5 Bg4 8.Nd5 Nd4 9.Nxb4 Nxb5, or 7.Ne2 Ne7 8.c3 Ba5 9.Ng3 c6 10.Ba4 Ng6 11.d4 d5, when 12.exd5 e4 may even favor Black.

Moreover, symmetrical positions may be disadvantageous to White in that he has to commit himself first. Watson notes that it is even difficult for White to play noncommittally in a symmetrical position, since almost every move has certain drawbacks. Fischer once went so far as to claim that after 1.Nf3 Nf6 2.g3 g6 3.Bg2 Bg7 4.0-0 0-0 5.d3 d6 (Reinhard–Fischer, Western Open 1963), Believe it or not,' Black stands better! Now, whatever White does, Black will vary it and get an asymmetrical position and have the superior position due to his better pawn structure!" However, GM Paul Keres responded in CHESS magazine, "We just don't believe it!" In symmetrical positions, as the Hodgson–Arkell and Portisch–Tal games discussed below illustrate, Black can continue to imitate White as long as he finds it feasible and desirable to do so, and deviate when that ceases to be the case.

Further, a particular extra move is sometimes more of a liability than an asset. For example, Soltis notes that the Exchange French position arising after 1.e4 e6 2.d4 d5 3.exd5 exd5 4.Nf3 Nf6 "is pretty equal". The same position, but with Black's knight moved to e4, arises in Petroff's Defense after 1.e4 e5 2.Nf3 Nf6 3.Nxe5 d6 4.Nf3 Nxe4 5.d4 d5. That position offers White better chances precisely because Black's extra move (...Ne4) allows the advanced knight to become a target for attack.

Finally, symmetrical positions may be difficult for the white player for psychological reasons. Watson writes that anyone who tries the Exchange French, "even if he thinks he is playing for a win, assume[s] a psychological burden. White has already ceded the advantage of the first move, and knows it, whereas Black is challenged to find ways to seize the initiative." Two famous examples of White losses in the Exchange French are M. Gurevich–Short and Tatai–Korchnoi. In M. Gurevich–Short, a game between two of the world's leading players, White needed only a draw to qualify for the Candidates Matches, while Black needed to win. Gurevich played passively and was outplayed by Short, who achieved the necessary win. In Tatai–Korchnoi, the Italian IM fell victim to Korchnoi's whirlwind , losing in just 14 moves.

Rowson gives the following example of Black outplaying White from the Symmetrical Variation of the English Opening. He remarks, "there is something compelling about Black's strategy. He seems to be saying: 'I will copy all your good moves, and as soon as you make a bad move, I won't copy you any more!

Hodgson–Arkell, Newcastle 2001: 1. c4 c5 2. g3 g6 3. Bg2 Bg7 4. Nc3 Nc6 5. a3 a6 6. Rb1 Rb8 7. b4 cxb4 8. axb4 b5 9. cxb5 axb5 (see diagram). Here Rowson remarks, "Both sides want to push their d-pawn and play Bf4/...Bf5, but White has to go first so Black gets to play ...d5 before White can play d4. This doesn't matter much, but it already points to the challenge that White faces here; his most natural continuations allow Black to play the moves he wants to. I would therefore say that White is in 'Zugzwang Lite' and that he remains in this state for several moves." 10. Nf3 d5 10...Nf6 11.0-0 0-0 12.d3 d6 13.Bd2 Bd7 would transpose to the Portisch–Tal game below. 11. d4 Nf6 12. Bf4 Rb6 13. 0-0 Bf5 14. Rb3 0-0 15. Ne5 Ne4 16. h3 h5 Finally breaking the symmetry. 17. Kh2 The position is still almost symmetrical, and White can find nothing useful to do with his extra move. Rowson whimsically suggests 17.h4!?, forcing Black to be the one to break the symmetry. 17... Re8! Rowson notes that this is a useful waiting move, covering e7, which needs protection in some lines, and possibly supporting an eventual ...e5 (see Black's twenty-second move). White cannot copy it, since after 18.Re1 Nxf2 Black would win a pawn. 18. Be3 Nxe5! 19. dxe5 Rc6! Rowson notes that with his more active pieces, "It looks like Black has some initiative." If now 20.Nxd5, Bxe5 "is at least equal for Black". 20. Nxb5 Bxe5! 20...Nxf2? 21.Qxd5! wins. 21. Nd4 Bxd4 22. Bb2 d4 (diagram). Now White has a difficult game: Rowson analyzes 25.e3?! Nxg3 24.fxg3 Bc2 25.Qf3 Bxb3 26.exd4 Bc4!, winning; 25.g4 hxg4 26.hxg4 Nxf2! 27.Rxf2 Bc2, winning; 25.Qe1!? Rc2! with advantage; and 25.f4 (risky-looking, but perhaps best) Nc3! 26.Bxc3 dxc3 27.Qxd8 Rexd8, and Black is better. 25. b6? Overlooking Black's threat. 25... Nxf2! 26. Qe1 If 26.Rxf2, Bc2 forks White's queen and rook. 26... Ne4 27. b7 Rb8 28. g4 hxg4 29. hxg4 Be6 30. Rb5 Nf6! 31. Rxf6 Qxf6 32. Qg3 Bc4 33. g5 Qh8+ 0–1

The opening of the following game between two world-class players, another Symmetrical English, took a similar course:

Lajos Portisch–Mikhail Tal, Candidates Match 1965: 1. Nf3 c5 2. c4 Nc6 3. Nc3 Nf6 4. g3 g6 5. Bg2 Bg7 6. 0-0 0-0 7. d3 a6 8. a3 Rb8 9. Rb1 b5 10. cxb5 axb5 11. b4 cxb4 12. axb4 d6 13. Bd2 Bd7 (see diagram). Once again, White is on move in a symmetrical position, but it is not obvious what he can do with his first-move initiative. Soltis writes, "It's ridiculous to think Black's position is better. But Mikhail Tal said it is easier to play. By moving second he gets to see White's move and then decide whether to match it." 14. Qc1 Here, Soltis writes that Black could maintain equality by keeping the symmetry: 14...Qc8 15.Bh6 Bh3. Instead, he plays to prove that White's queen is misplaced. 14... Rc8! 15. Bh6 Nd4! Threatening 16...Nxe2+. 16. Nxd4 Bxh6 17. Qxh6 Rxc3 18. Qd2 Qc7 19. Rfc1 Rc8 (diagram). Although the pawn structure is still symmetrical, Black's control of the c- gives him the advantage. Black ultimately reached an endgame two pawns up, but White managed to hold a draw in 83 moves.

Tal himself lost a famous game as White from a symmetrical position in Tal–Beliavsky, USSR Championship 1974.

Tournament and match play
In chess tournaments and matches, the frequency with which each player receives white and black is an important consideration. In matches, the players' colors in the first game are determined by drawing lots, and alternated thereafter. In round robin tournaments with an odd number of players, each player receives an equal number of whites and blacks; with an even number of players, each receives one extra white or black. Where one or more players withdraws from the tournament, the tournament director may change the assigned colors in some games so that no player receives two more blacks than whites, or vice versa. The double-round robin tournament is considered to give the most reliable final standings, since each player receives the same number of whites and blacks, and plays both White and Black against each opponent.

In Swiss system tournaments, the tournament director tries to ensure that each player receives, as nearly as possible, the same number of games as White and Black, and that the player's color alternates from round to round. After the first round, the director may deviate from the otherwise prescribed pairings in order to give as many players as possible their equalizing or due colors. More substantial deviations are permissible to avoid giving a player two more blacks than whites (for example, three blacks in four games) than vice versa, since extra whites "cause far less player distress" than extra blacks, which impose "a significant handicap" on the affected player. Tournaments with an even number of rounds cause the most problems, since if there is a disparity, it is greater (e.g., a player receiving two whites and four blacks).

Solving chess

The game of chess is not solved, meaning it has not been determined with certainty whether a perfectly played game would end in a win for White, a draw, or even a win for Black. Due to its high level of complexity and the limitations of computer technology it is considered unlikely that it will be solved in the foreseeable future.

In his 1950 paper "Programming a Computer for Playing Chess", information theorist Claude Shannon argued that in principle the game of chess ought to be solvable. In practical terms, however, he argued that it is not feasible for any computer to actually do this. He estimated that a computer would need to calculate 10120 positions from the initial position, which he said would take 1090 years. It is thus theoretically possible to solve chess; however, according to Shannon, the time frame required puts this possibility beyond the limits of any feasible technology.

Hans-Joachim Bremermann, a professor of mathematics and biophysics at the University of California at Berkeley, further argued in a 1965 paper that the "speed, memory, and processing capacity of any possible future computer equipment are limited by certain physical barriers: the light barrier, the quantum barrier, and the thermodynamical barrier. These limitations imply, for example, that no computer, however constructed, will ever be able to examine the entire tree of possible move sequences of the game of chess." Nonetheless, Bremermann did not foreclose the possibility that a computer would someday be able to solve chess. He wrote, "In order to have a computer play a perfect or nearly perfect game [of chess] it will be necessary either to analyze the game completely ... or to analyze the game in an approximate way and combine this with a limited amount of tree searching. ... A theoretical understanding of such heuristic programming, however, is still very much wanting."

Recent advances in computer science have not significantly changed that assessment. The game of checkers was solved in 2007, but it has roughly the square root of the number of positions in chess. Jonathan Schaeffer, the scientist who led the effort, said a breakthrough such as quantum computing would be needed before solving chess could even be attempted, but he does not rule out the possibility, saying that the one thing he learned from his 16-year effort of solving checkers "is to never underestimate the advances in technology".

Quotations
 "You will win with either color if you are the better player, but it takes longer with Black." — Isaac Kashdan
 "When I am White I win because I am White. When I am Black I win because I am Bogoljubow." — Efim Bogoljubow
 "To play for a draw, at any rate with White, is to some degree a crime against chess." — Mikhail Tal

Notes

References

Sources

Chess theory